Yuan Hua (born 16 April 1974) is a Chinese judoka and Olympic champion. She won a gold medal in the heavyweight division at the 2000 Summer Olympics in Sydney.

References

External links
 
 

1974 births
Living people
Olympic judoka of China
Judoka at the 2000 Summer Olympics
Olympic gold medalists for China
Olympic medalists in judo
Asian Games medalists in judo
Sportspeople from Liaoyang
Judoka at the 1998 Asian Games
Chinese female judoka
Medalists at the 2000 Summer Olympics
Asian Games gold medalists for China
Medalists at the 1998 Asian Games
Universiade medalists in judo
People from Liaoyang
Universiade gold medalists for China
Medalists at the 1999 Summer Universiade
20th-century Chinese women
21st-century Chinese women